Tamolanica is a genus of praying mantises native to Asia.  They have common names such as shield mantis, hood mantis (or hooded mantis), and leaf mantis (or leafy mantis) because of their extended, leaf-like thoraxes. The following species are recognised in the genus Tamolanica:
Tamolanica andaina
Tamolanica atricoxis
Tamolanica decipiens
Tamolanica denticulata
Tamolanica dilena
Tamolanica katauana
Tamolanica leopoldi
Tamolanica pectoralis
Tamolanica phryne
Tamolanica tamolana (New Guinea shield mantis)

See also
List of mantis genera and species
Leaf mantis
Shield mantis

References

Hierodulinae
Insects of Asia
Mantodea genera